The Type 41 Class was a type of patrol boats of the Military of Switzerland, commissioned during the Second World War to patrol the border lakes of Switzerland. The class comprised nine units, commissioned between 1941 and 1944 in three series: Thun and Brienz in December 1941, Sargans, Schwyz and Unterwalden in July 1943, and Spiez, Bönigen and Brunnen in April 1944; Furthermore, the prototype Uri was also commissioned. They remained in service until late 1983, when they were replaced by the more modern Type 80 (Aquarius class). In 1962, the units of the class were upgraded with an electric generator, radars and radios, and had their armament upgraded: the 24 mm Type 41 anti-tank rifle—not a personal weapon at  —at the bow was replaced by a 20mm autocannon, and the twin anti-air MG 38 machine guns at the stern were replaced by an MG 51 machine gun.

When not on active duty in the military, the units were operated by the border patrol of the Customs office.
 Thun
Builder: Werner Risch AG, Zürich-Wolishofen
Begun:
Launched: 1941
Completed:
Fate:
 Brienz
Builder: Werner Risch AG, Zürich-Wolishofen
Begun:
Launched: 1941
Completed:
Fate:
 Sargans
Builder: Werner Risch AG, Zürich-Wolishofen
Begun:
Launched: 1943
Completed:
Fate:
 Schwyz
Builder: Werner Risch AG, Zürich-Wolishofen
Begun:
Launched: 1943
Completed:
Fate:
 Unterwalden
Builder: Werner Risch AG, Zürich-Wolishofen
Begun:
Launched: 1943
Completed:
Fate:
 Spiez
Builder: Werner Risch AG, Zürich-Wolishofen
Begun:
Launched: 1944
Completed:
Fate: On display in the permanent exhibit of the Swiss Museum of Transport in Lucerne.
 Bönigen
Builder: Werner Risch AG, Zürich-Wolishofen
Begun:
Launched: 1944
Completed:
Fate:
 Brunnen
Builder: Werner Risch AG, Zürich-Wolishofen
Begun:
Launched: 1944
Completed:
Fate:

Sources and references

References

Sources 
 Information label at the Swiss Museum of Transport.
 History, pbooturi.ch
 Photographs, pbooturi.ch

World War II patrol vessels